Noël Liétaer (17 November 1908 – 21 February 1941) was a French association footballer. He played for U.S. Tourcoing and Excelsior AC Roubaix, and earned 7 caps for the France national football team, and played in the 1934 FIFA World Cup. A soldier in the French Army's 100th Infantry Regiment, he died of an illness in Rostock as a prisoner of war in 1941.

References

1908 births
1941 deaths
French footballers
France international footballers
1934 FIFA World Cup players
US Tourcoing FC players
Excelsior AC (France) players
French Army personnel of World War II
French prisoners of war in World War II
World War II prisoners of war held by Germany
Association football midfielders
Sportspeople from Nord (French department)
French military personnel killed in World War II
Footballers from Hauts-de-France